Mounkeo Oraboun (born 4 May 1942) is a Laotian politician. As of 2010, he is the current Minister of Information and Culture in Laos. He attends many important events in the country and southeast Asia and is an active member of ASEAN, chairing the 10th conference in Vientiane in November 2009. As the Minister of Culture, Oraboun busily attends a diversity of events and inaugurations across Laos, ranging from attending newspaper anniversaries, to hotel openings.

References

Lao People's Revolutionary Party politicians
Members of the 5th Central Committee of the Lao People's Revolutionary Party
Members of the 6th Central Committee of the Lao People's Revolutionary Party
Members of the 7th Central Committee of the Lao People's Revolutionary Party
Members of the 8th Central Committee of the Lao People's Revolutionary Party
Government ministers of Laos
Living people
1942 births